Kinsale was a United Kingdom Parliament constituency in Ireland, returning one MP. It was an original constituency represented in Parliament when the Union of Great Britain and Ireland took effect on 1 January 1801.

Boundaries
This constituency was the parliamentary borough of Kinsale in County Cork. A Topographical Directory of Ireland, published in 1837, describes the Parliamentary history of the borough.

The new boundary contained in the Parliamentary Boundaries (Ireland) Act 1832 was:

Members of Parliament

Elections

Elections in the 1830s

 On petition, Mahony was unseated in favour of Thomas

Elections in the 1840s

On petition, Guinness was unseated and a new writ was issued, causing a by-election.

Elections in the 1850s
Hawes resigned by accepting the office of Steward of the Chiltern Hundreds, causing a by-election.

Elections in the 1860s
Arnott resigned, causing a by-election.

Elections in the 1870s

Elections in the 1880s

References

The Parliaments of England by Henry Stooks Smith (1st edition published in three volumes 1844–50), 2nd edition edited (in one volume) by F.W.S. Craig (Political Reference Publications 1973)

External links
Part of the Library Ireland: Irish History and Culture website containing the text of A Topographical Directory of Ireland, by Samuel Lewis (a work published by S. Lewis & Co of London in 1837) including an article on Kinsale

Kinsale
Westminster constituencies in County Cork (historic)
Constituencies of the Parliament of the United Kingdom established in 1801
Constituencies of the Parliament of the United Kingdom disestablished in 1885